Archilestes neblina is a species of spreadwing in the damselfly family Lestidae. It is found in Central America.

References

Further reading

 

Lestidae
Articles created by Qbugbot
Insects described in 1982